Nijhof is a surname. Notable people with the surname include:

 Henk Nijhof (born 1952), Dutch politician
 Sanne Nijhof (born 1987), Dutch model

See also
Martinus Nijhoff (1894–1953), Dutch poet and essayist

Dutch-language surnames